Khowzineh-ye Baqer (also Romanized as Khowzīneh-ye Bāqer) is a village in Kheybar Rural District, Choghamish District, Dezful County, Khuzestan Province, Iran. At the 2006 census, its population was 882, in 139 families.

References 

Populated places in Dezful County